The Pobrežje District is a city district of the City Municipality of Maribor in northeastern Slovenia. In 2014, the district had a population of 13,006. The Pobrežje District is subdivided into North Pobrežje, East Pobrežje, West Pobrežje, and South Pobrežje. Maribor Cemetery, the largest cemetery in the city, is located in the district.

References

Districts of the City Municipality of Maribor